The Gang House, also known as the Gang Residence, is a historic home in Syracuse, New York designed by Ward Wellington Ward.  It was built in 1914 and was listed on the National Register of Historic Places in 1997.

The house is gabled and has a complex facade.  It is brick-clad on the first floor exterior, and stuccoed above.

The nearby Chapman House was also designed by Ward.

References

External links

Bed and Breakfast Wellington

Bed and breakfasts in New York (state)
Houses in Syracuse, New York
National Register of Historic Places in Syracuse, New York
Houses on the National Register of Historic Places in New York (state)
Houses completed in 1914